Meng Yang (born 16 July 1989) is a Chinese footballer who plays for China League Two side Ningbo Xiangshan.

Club career
Meng Yang would play for the Beijing Guoan youth team before he was loaned to Beijing Guoan's satellite team Beijing Guoan Talent, which would play as a foreign team in Singapore's S.League in 2010. He would subsequently return to Beijing Guoan and be promoted to the senior team in the 2011 Chinese Super League campaign. He would then later be loaned to Meizhou Kejia and Beijing BIT.

On 23 February 2017 he joined second-tier football club Yunnan Lijiang.

Career statistics

Notes

References

External links
MENG YANG at Soccerway.com

1989 births
Living people
Chinese footballers
Association football midfielders
Singapore Premier League players
China League One players
China League Two players
Beijing Guoan F.C. players
Meizhou Hakka F.C. players
Yunnan Flying Tigers F.C. players
Dalian Transcendence F.C. players
Baoding Yingli Yitong players